Farnous is a village in French Guiana. It is located on the Route National 1 between Macouria and Cayenne.

Reference

Macouria
Villages in French Guiana